Pyrgotis chrysomela is a species of moth of the family Tortricidae. It is endemic to New Zealand.

The wingspan is about 17 mm. The forewings are deep fulvous (tawny) orange. The hindwings are grey. The type specimen of this species was collected by George Hudson in January at Kaeo and held at the Natural History Museum, London.

References

Moths described in 1914
Archipini
Moths of New Zealand
Endemic fauna of New Zealand
Endemic moths of New Zealand